WKHP-LP (94.9 FM) was a radio station licensed to Keene, New Hampshire, United States. The station, established in 2005, was owned by Harvest Christian Fellowship (Keene Foursquare Church).

Harvest Christian Fellowship surrendered WKHP-LP's license to the Federal Communications Commission on August 31, 2021, who cancelled it the same day.

References

External links
 

KHP-LP
Defunct religious radio stations in the United States
Radio stations established in 2005
KHP-LP
Cheshire County, New Hampshire
Keene, New Hampshire
2005 establishments in New Hampshire
Defunct radio stations in the United States
Radio stations disestablished in 2021
2021 disestablishments in New Hampshire